Henry Gibson Dan  (25 August 1929– 30 December 2020), known as Seaman Dan, an Indigenous Australian, was a Torres Strait Islander singer-songwriter with a national and international reputation whose first recording was released in 2000. His album Perfect Pearl won the ARIA Award for Best World Music Album in 2004 and in 2009 won again with Sailing Home. 

He performed in Japan and throughout Australia, most notably at the National Folk Festival, Port Fairy Folk Festival, Darwin Festival, Adelaide and Adelaide Fringe Festivals, Laura Dance and Music Festival, Tasmania's 10 Days on the Island Festival, NAIDOC Ball, and at the National Museum of Australia's Tracking Kultja Festival.

Early life
Seaman Dan was born on Thursday Island in the Torres Strait Islands Region of far-north Queensland, Australia in 1929. His great-grandfather was a sailor from Jamaica in the West Indies and his great-grandmother a chief's daughter from New Caledonia. Another grandfather came from the island of Niue in Polynesia. In the late 1940s, 1950s and 1960s, Seaman Dan worked as a boat captain and pearl diver, gathering pearl and trochus shells across the north of Australia. He also did jobs such as mineral prospecting and taxi driving.

Singing
Dan's singing came from family, friends and associating with talented musicians in his multi-cultural maritime working life, creating a fusion of music from Australia, Melanesia, North America, Africa and Polynesia, notably the Thursday Island 'hula' style. He has been a regular performer at Thursday Island's local hotels and a community musician for decades.

In its citation on awarding Dan the Australia Council for the Arts Red Ochre Award in 2005 for his outstanding contribution to the development and recognition of Aboriginal and Torres Strait Islander arts and culture, the Council claimed he was a charismatic and consummate performer who blended traditional Torres Strait Islander and pearling songs with jazz, hula and blues. In 2013, he received a Hall of Fame Award at the National Indigenous Music Awards in Darwin. 

In 2004, Dan semi-retired at the age of 85 years.

In 2019 Seaman Dan was honoured at the Queensland Music Awards with the Grant McLennan Lifetime Achievement Award.

He died in Edmonton on 30 December 2020, aged 91.

Discography

Studio albums

Compilation albums

Published works

Awards and nominations

ARIA Music Awards
The ARIA Music Awards is an annual awards ceremony that recognises excellence, innovation, and achievement across all genres of Australian music. Seaman Dan won two awards from four nominations.

|-
| 2004
| Perfect Pearl
| ARIA Award for Best World Music Album
| 
|-
| 2006
| Island Way
| Best World Music Album
| 
|-
| 2009
| Sailing Home
| Best World Music Album
| 
|-
| 2016
| An Old Man of the Sea
| Best World Music Album
| 
|-

Australia Council for the Arts
The Australia Council for the Arts is the arts funding and advisory body for the Government of Australia. Since 1993, it has awarded a Red Ochre Award. It is presented to an outstanding Indigenous Australian (Aboriginal Australian or Torres Strait Islander) artist for lifetime achievement.

|-
| 2005
| himself
| Red Ochre Award
| 
|-

National Indigenous Music Awards
The National Indigenous Music Awards (NIMA) recognise excellence, dedication, innovation and outstanding contribution to the Northern Territory music industry. They commenced in 2004.

|-
| National Indigenous Music Awards 2013
| himself
| Hall of Fame Inductee
| 
|-

Queensland Music Awards
The Queensland Music Awards (previously known as Q Song Awards) are annual awards celebrating Queensland, Australia's brightest emerging artists and established legends. They commenced in 2006.
 
|-
|2019
| himself
| Grant McLennan Lifetime Achievement Award 
| 
|-

References

External links
Media release - Central Queensland University, Rockhampton . Seaman Dan gains Red Ochre Award 3 January 2006
Seaman Dan AM, Q150 digital story, Living Queensland, State Library of Queensland
 

1929 births
2020 deaths
ARIA Award winners
Indigenous Australian musicians
Australian people of Jamaican descent
Australian people of New Caledonian descent
Australian people of Niuean descent
Australian songwriters
Australian male singers
Torres Strait Islands culture
Torres Strait Islanders
Members of the Order of Australia